Eat Your Mind: The Radical Life and Work of Kathy Acker is a 2022 book by Jason McBride that examines the life of Kathy Acker. The book has seven "positive" reviews and four "rave" reviews, according to review aggregator Book Marks.

References

2022 non-fiction books
English-language books
Simon & Schuster books